Code page 1104 (CCSID 1104), also known as CP1104, F7DEC, ISO-IR-025 or NF Z 62-010 (1973) is an IBM code page number assigned to the French variant of DEC's National Replacement Character Set (NRCS). The 7-bit character set was introduced for DEC's computer terminal systems, starting with the VT200 series in 1983, but it is also used by IBM for their DEC emulation.

ISO-IR-025 was previously also the French variant of ISO 646 (NF Z 62-010), it was superseded by Code page 1010 (NF Z 62-010:1982, ISO-IR-069) in that respect, from which it differs in only one point. It is also a close derivation from ASCII, with only nine code points differing.

Code page layout

See also
Code page 1010 (similar ISO 646-FR code page)
Code page 1020 (French-Canadian NRCS)
National Replacement Character Set (NRCS)

References

1104